(born 8 March 1933, Toshima, Tokyo) is a Japanese comedian and musician (guitarist and ukulele player).
Takagi is one of the members of The Drifters.

Works
 Hachiji Dayo, Zen'inshugo! (1969–85)
 Dorifu Daibakusho (1976–2003)
 Tobe Son Goku (1977–78)

References

External links
Boo Takagi at Izawa Office

1933 births
Living people
Japanese comedians
Japanese male actors
Japanese guitarists
People from Tokyo